Dennis Martinus Hendrikus Rijnbeek (born August 7, 1972 in Haarlem) is a former freestyle swimmer from the Netherlands, who competed for his native country at the 2000 Summer Olympics in Sydney, Australia. There he took over too early in the qualifying heats of the 4 × 100 m freestyle relay, which meant disqualification for the Dutch relay team. He retired from the sport in 2001.

References
Profile on Zwemkroniek (in Dutch)
 Dutch Olympic Committee

1972 births
Living people
Dutch male freestyle swimmers
Olympic swimmers of the Netherlands
Swimmers at the 2000 Summer Olympics
Sportspeople from Haarlem
20th-century Dutch people
21st-century Dutch people